{{DISPLAYTITLE:C14H16N4O3}}
The molecular formula C14H16N4O3 (molar mass: 288.302 g/mol, exact mass: 288.1222 u) may refer to:

 Obidoxime
 Piromidic acid

Molecular formulas